Daniel "Dan" Wright  is an English comedian and actor who is best known for playing Little Cook Small in the CBeebies programme Big Cook, Little Cook with Steve Marsh, who played Big Cook Ben. Marsh and Wright form the comedy duo Electric Forecast, and have made numerous television appearances together, such as hosting Sky 1's Crash Test Dummies in February 2007.

The duo have also appeared in Kingdom, as a pair of duelling brothers and in Hotel Trubble as demolition workers Mr. Wreck and Mr. Ball, as well as hosting the CBBC show Space Hoppers. In February 2013, Wright starred in the CBBC sketch show Fit. Since January 2014, Wright has appeared in 4 O'Clock Club as Mr. Nunn, the tyrannical sports teacher.

Early life 
Wright attended the Anglo European School in Ingatestone, Essex. In October 2001, Wright formed the stand up double act Electric Forecast, with Steve Marsh, and began performing shortly afterwards. In August 2003, they performed at the 2003 Edinburgh Festival Fringe. In February 2004, they began hosting the programme by CBeebies, Big Cook, Little Cook, together.

Since then, they have hosted several television programmes together, including Space Hoppers for CBBC, and Crash Test Dummies for Sky 1. They were also guest hosts on Big Brother's Big Mouth, from 10 July to 14 July 2007.

Other work 
In April 2007, Wright presented the documentary F*** Off, I'm Ginger, as part of BBC Three's Body Image documentary series. He made two guest appearances in 2010, in the television programme by CBBC, Scoop. In February 2013, he starred in Fit, a CBBC sketch show, alongside Aisling Bea, William Hartley, and Tala Gouveia.

He performed his stand-up act in August 2012, Michael Jackson Touched Me, which received a nomination for Best Show at the 2012 Leicester Comedy Festival. From 2012 to 2014, he made 16 appearances on the daytime talk show by Channel 5, The Wright Stuff. In January 2014, he began appearing as PE Teacher, Mr. Nunn, in the third series of the CBBC show 4 O'Clock Club. In January 2015, he returned for the fourth series, and returned for the fifth, sixth and seventh series.

Filmography

References 

Living people
English male comedians
Year of birth missing (living people)
21st-century English male actors
English male television actors
Place of birth missing (living people)